Melanie Duff (born 31 October 1961) is an Irish equestrian. She competed in two events at the 1992 Summer Olympics.

References

External links
 

1961 births
Living people
Irish female equestrians
Olympic equestrians of Ireland
Equestrians at the 1992 Summer Olympics
Place of birth missing (living people)
20th-century Irish women